Loring is an extinct town in Wright County, in the U.S. state of Missouri. The GNIS classifies it as a populated place.  The community is located just east of Missouri Route 5 between Hartville and Grovespring. It is near the headwaters of Steins Creek.

A post office called Loring was established in 1905, and remained in operation until 1954. The community has the name of the local Loring family.

References

Ghost towns in Missouri
Former populated places in Wright County, Missouri